The 2016 National Collegiate Athletic Association (NCAA) Division I Football Championship Subdivision (FCS) football rankings comprises two human polls, in addition to various publications' preseason polls. Unlike the Football Bowl Subdivision (FBS), college football's governing body, the NCAA, bestows the national championship title through a 24-team tournament. The following weekly polls determine the top 25 teams at the NCAA Division I Football Championship Subdivision level of college football for the 2016 season. The STATS poll is voted by media members while the Coaches' Poll is determined by coaches at the FCS level.

The NCAA Division I FCS Selection Committee released its Top 10 beginning in Week 9, and continues up to the week of the announcement of the full playoff field on November 20.

Legend

STATS Poll

Coaches' Poll

Rankings for the FCS Playoffs

References

Rankings
NCAA Division I FCS football rankings